Mariano Werner (born December 30, 1988 in Paraná, Entre Ríos) is an Argentine professional motor racing driver. he is currently competing in Turismo Carretera (TC), Turismo Nacional (TN) and TC Pick Up series.

Throughout his career, he has won five national championships: Formula Renault Argentina (2006 and 2007), Turismo Nacional Clase 3 (2017) and Turismo Carretera (2020 and 2021).

Career 
Werner started his career in 2005 in the FR national series. He stayed two more years in this series, winning the 2006 and 2007 championships. He was racing for the Werner Competición team. In 2006 he competed in a Formula Renault 2.0 Eurocup round with Jenzer.

In 2007 he finished third in TC Pista, which allowed him to promote to Turismo Carretera the next year. In 2008 Werner also made his TC 2000 debut with Toyota Team Argentina and in 2009 wins for the first time in both series.

In 2010, competing with Omar Martínez's team, he lost the TC championship for not having won a final race. It was he who added the most points in the play-offs but victory was a necessary requirement and then the title went to Agustín Canapino. Besides he was third in the TC 2000 championship.

In 2011 he finished second in TC 2000, behind Matías Rossi. In 2013 and 2016 he is runner-up in the TC championship.

After an illegal maneuver on Matías Rossi on the last lap of the final TC race in 2016, Werner was sanctioned with exclusion for the middle of the 2017 season and a financial fine. Werner took Rossi off the track in the last corner and caused him to lose the championship to Guillermo Ortelli.

In 2017 he was third in the Súper TC 2000 championship (successor to TC 2000) with a Peugeot 408 of Team Peugeot Total Argentina and Turismo Nacional Clase 3 champion with a Fiat Linea of FP Racing. He was third in 2018 in TN Clase 3 and in 2019 in TC.

Werner was TC champion in the 2020 season. With three victories, he won the play-off with a 20 points of advantage. This year he also races in TC Pick Up with a Toyota Hilux.

He was again champion of Turismo Carretera in 2021. He scored fewer points in the play-offs than Uruguayan Mauricio Lambiris, but Lambiris did not achieve the victory necessary to be champion.

Racing record

Racing career summary

3rdReferences

External links 
 
 

1988 births
Living people
Argentine racing drivers
Turismo Carretera drivers
TC 2000 Championship drivers
Top Race V6 drivers
Sportspeople from Entre Ríos Province
Formula Renault Argentina drivers
Súper TC 2000 drivers
Jenzer Motorsport drivers
Formula Renault Eurocup drivers